Jacob Bertrand (born March 6, 2000) is an American actor who began his career as a child actor appearing in the 2009 film Duress and playing guest roles on television series such as The Cape and The Middle. He is known for playing the titular character in the 2014 Disney XD series Kirby Buckets, and Jack Malloy in the 2016 Disney Channel Original Movie The Swap. Since 2018,  Bertrand has played the series regular role of Eli "Hawk" Moskowitz in the YouTube Premium and Netflix series Cobra Kai.

Career

Prior to his work for Disney, Bertrand had several roles in Nickelodeon productions. He was a regular on the sitcom Marvin Marvin, voiced the main character Gil in Season 2 of the animated series Bubble Guppies, appeared as a minor character on the teen sitcom iCarly, and co-starred as Charlie on the fantasy-comedy film Jinxed. Since 2018 he has appeared in the YouTube Premium/Netflix television series Cobra Kai.

Filmography

Video game
 Cobra Kai: The Karate Kid Saga Continues (2020), as Eli "Hawk" Moskowitz (voice role)
 Cobra Kai 2: Dojos Rising (2022), as Eli "Hawk" Moskowitz (voice role)

References

External links

2000 births
Living people
Place of birth missing (living people)
American male television actors
American male film actors
American male voice actors
American male child actors
21st-century American male actors